Jill Baker (born 1952) is a British actress who is Best known for her role as Pauline Harris in Only Fools and Horses. She has worked extensively in theatre and television for 50 years.

Personal life
Baker is a graduate of the Bristol Old Vic Theatre School.

She and actor Bob Peck were married for 17 years, from 1982 until his death, in 1999. They had three children.

Career
She made her debut in the TV movie Savages in 1975 and has worked steadily on television and theatre since. Her theatre work includes Sufficient Carbohydrate by Denis Potter, Goosepimples, Mike Leigh, All My Sons,  all in the West End and the premiere of The Secret Rapture in 1988. She has also been working as an actress in British television since 1975. Along with playing a recurring lead character in Rides, Screaming and Fish, she has made cameo appearances in individual episodes of Blore M.P, The Professionals (1980), Only Fools and Horses (1981), Me and My Girl (1983), "Last Bus to Woodstock" (An Inspector Morse TV-Mystery) (1988), Tales of Sherwood Forest (1989), Prime Suspect (1995), The Girl  (1996) as Anne Thornton, The Broker's Man (1997–98) as Claudette Monro-Foster,  The Vanishing Man (1998) as Dr. Jeffries, Perfect Strangers (2001), New Tricks (2003), A Touch of Frost (2004), Secret Smile (2005), Waking the Dead, Holby City,  (2007), Spooks (2008) and Wallander, Episode 1 in 2008. She has also appeared as Lady de Lesseps in Shakespeare in Love. In 2009 she appeared in the ITV Drama Whatever It Takes, In 2011 she appeared in the ITV Drama Midsomer Murders "Not in My Back Yard" as Eleanor Swanscombe. In 2014, she appeared in Happy Valley as Helen Gallagher. Baker appeared in Only Fools and Horses in the episode "The Second Time Around", as Del Boy (David Jason)'s ex-fiancée, Pauline Harris.

Filmography

Film

Television

References

External links

1952 births
Living people
English stage actresses
English film actresses
English television actresses